Yeouido Station is a subway station on Line 5 and Line 9 of the Seoul Subway system. It is one of the stations that serve the eponymous island of Yeouido, one of Seoul's financial hubs. The large Yeouido Park is close to this station.

A new subway line starting from Yeouido broke ground in December 2011 heading south.

In 2023, the new subway line will be extended to Ansan in southwest Gyeonggi Province. Travel time from Yeouido to Ansan is expected to take only around 30 minutes.

Station layout

Vicinity
 Exit 1: Gwangjang APT
 Exit 2: Financial Supervisory Service, KT
 Exit 3: National Assembly of South Korea, Yeouido Park, Korean Broadcasting System (KBS)
 Exit 4: Small Business Corporation
 Exit 5: Korea Exchange, Munhwa Broadcasting Corporation (MBC)
 Exit 6: Yunjung Elementary School, Yunjung Middle School, Yeouido Saetgang Ecological Park

Attractions
 IFC Seoul: IFC Office Towers, IFC Mall Seoul and Conrad Seoul Hotel. The station is connected to the complex by a moving walkway, and is approximately two kilometers from Line 5.

References

Seoul Metropolitan Subway stations
Metro stations in Yeongdeungpo District
Railway stations opened in 1996
Yeouido
1996 establishments in South Korea
20th-century architecture in South Korea